Hamit is the Turkish spelling of the Arabic masculine given name Hamid. 

People named Hamit include:

 Hamit Altıntop, Turkish footballer
 Hamit Kaplan, Turkish sport wrestler
 Hamit Karakus, Dutch politician
 Hamit Zübeyir Koşay, Turkish archaeologist
 Hamit Şare, Turkish alpine skier

Turkish masculine given names